Subhodhayam is a 1980 Indian Telugu-language drama film written and directed by K. Viswanath and produced by C. H. Narasimha Rao. 
It stars an ensemble cast with Chandramohan,  Sulakshana, Sakshi Ranga Rao, Annapurna,Charuhasan, and Manorama playing pivotal roles. K. V. Mahadevan composed the music for the film while Kasthuri handled the cinematography. Subhodayam explores human relationships in the context of social issues, and dignity of manual labour. In 1982, Viswanath directed the Hindi remake Kaamchor; which was also successful.

Plot 
Chandram  (Chandramohan) has been an aimless and lazy slacker all his adult life, who has no goals for his future. He lives in Hyderabad with his brother (Sakshi Ranga Rao), sister in law (Annapurna), and nephew (Master Phani Krishna). On one occasion, he gate-crashes into one of his brother's supervisor's friend's wedding ceremony and finds out that the would be groom is to live with his In-laws. To Chandram's delight, he finds out that the bride has an unmarried sister (Sulakshana), who is the daughter of a rich industrialist. Friendhsip develops between the two and she helps him get a job in her father's company, later Chandram convinces her father, and gets married to her.

On one hand Chandram wanted to lead a life of comfort and luxury in his wife's house, while his wife chooses the life of philanthropy and donates significant amount of her properties to an orphanage, leaving Chandram in shock. Depressed by these events Chandram leaves his wife, and in disguise as a sanyasi joins the same ashram maintained by a guru (Charuhasan) where his wife works as a manual labour. How Chandram slowly gets to understand his wife's perspective, what are the events that lead to Chandram's transformation, and how he reconciles with his wife forms the rest of the plot.

Cast 
 Chandramohan
 Sulakshana
 Sakshi Ranga Rao
 Annapurna 
 Charuhasan
 Manorama
 Bhanuprakash
 Ram Babu
 Potti Prasad
 MC Das
 Vinnakota Vijayaram
 SST Sai
 Venkata Rao
 Munduri Sathyam
 Master Phani Krishna
 K. V. Pradeep Kumar
 K. V. Uday Kumar
 Sastry
 Krishna Priya
 Vasantha 
 Vijayalakshmi
 Baby Mrudula
 Baby Latha
 Amar Prasad
 Kumar Monohar
 Rammohana Rao 
 Pattabhi Prasad

Soundtrack 
The music was composed by K. V. Mahadevan.

References

External links 
 
 

1980 films
1980s Telugu-language films
Alternative education
Fiction about social issues
Fiction about society
Films directed by K. Viswanath
Films scored by K. V. Mahadevan
Films shot in Andhra Pradesh
Indian romantic drama films
Indian drama films
Telugu films remade in other languages
Works about economics
Films set in Hyderabad, India
Films about families